The New York City Taxi and Limousine Commission (NYC TLC) is an agency of the New York City government that licenses and regulates the medallion taxis and for-hire vehicle industries, including app-based companies such as Uber and Lyft. The TLC's regulatory landscape includes medallion (yellow) taxicabs, green or Boro taxicabs, black cars (including both traditional and app-based services), community-based livery cars, commuter vans, paratransit vehicles (ambulettes), and some luxury limousines.

New York State-issued TLC license plates are marked "T&LC".

History 
Mayor John Lindsay created the TLC in 1971 to regulate the taxi and for-hire vehicle industries. Before the creation of the agency, the NYPD's Hack Bureau regulated the taxicab industry, starting in 1925. The bureau supervised "hacks", which referred to both taxicabs (hackney cabs) and cab drivers (also "hack drivers").

The TLC  has acted as a technical consultant for major TV shows and films that involved taxicab use, such as Friends, Conspiracy Theory, and the Bone Collector.

The TLC has a Driver Safety Honor Roll, which recognizes the safest Taxi and For-Hire Vehicle drivers in New York City.  Drivers on the Honor Roll have had no crashes involving fatalities or injuries, no traffic violations, and no violations of TLC safety-related rules for five years or more.

Structure 
The TLC Chair and Commissioner, presides over the agency's board of nine commissioners during regularly scheduled public Commission meetings.  Eight of the commissioners are unsalaried and appointed by the Mayor, with the advice and consent of the City Council.  Five of the commissioners—one seat for each borough—are recommended for appointment by a majority vote of the councilmembers within each borough.  Commissioners serve a seven-year term. The agency's regulations are compiled in title 35 of the New York City Rules.

The TLC chair, who is salaried, also heads the agency, which has a staff of about 600 employees.  The agency's divisions and bureaus include Uniformed Services, Licensing, Legal, Policy, Public Affairs, Safety & Emissions, among others.  The Uniformed Services Bureau has more than 200 inspectors.

Operations 
As the regulator, the TLC establishes the larger public transportation policy that governs taxi and for-hire transportation services in New York City. The agency's responsibilities include protecting public safety and consumer rights, issuing and regulating licenses, setting and enforcing the fare rate in taxis, limiting taxi lease rates, and overseeing the sale of taxi medallions.

The TLC licenses about 170,000 unique professional drivers in New York City. It is common for TLC-licensed drivers to work for several companies, as well as in different industry segments. The agency also licenses more than 100,000 vehicles, as well as over 1,000 for-hire vehicle bases, according to its 2016 annual report.

TLC Enforcement Division

The Enforcement Division, part of the Uniformed Services Bureau (USB) is staffed by uniformed officers who are NYC Special Patrolmen (NYS Peace Officers).

There are approximately 240 officers.

This includes the Vision Zero squad, which focuses on safety-related enforcement like moving violations, which include failing to yield to pedestrians and cell phone usage while driving.

The TLC is testing new vehicle safety technologies in licensed vehicles as part of a safety pilot, which began in 2015, according to the agency's website. Technologies include electronic data recorders, speed governors, and driver-alert systems. The pilot looks at how safety technologies affect driving behaviors, collision rates, the experience of drivers and passengers, and the expenses of drivers.

According to the TLC, the primary mission of the Enforcement Division is:

Uniform
TLC Special Patrolmen officers wear a typical NYC law enforcement style uniform:

Dark blue shirt with tie and tie-clip (with "T.L.C - N.Y." letters on tie-pin), with shield, TLC patch and collar pins (one is "USB" one is "TLC") and rank (if any)
Dark blue trousers
Dark blue NYC style peaked eight-point cap, with silver capbadge
Dark blue jacket with shield, TLC patch and rank (if any)
Duty belt
Black boots.

The shoulder patch is now ver similar to the other NYC Law Enforcement agencies and reads "TAXI AND LIMOUSINE COMMISSION POLICE, CITY OF NEW YORK", with the standard NYC police logo inside the centre of the patch.

For Lieutenants and above, white shirts are worn instead of blue, the shield, capbadge and capband are gold, rather than silver.

Powers and Authority
TLC Officer's are classed as NYC Special Patrolman who are appointed in connection with special duties of employment, and such designation confers limited NYS Peace Officer powers upon the employee, pursuant to New York State Criminal Procedure Law § 2.10(27). 

The exercise of these powers is limited to the employee's geographical area of employment and only while such employee is actually on duty as listed in Chapter 13 subsection (C): Special Patrolmen

Equipment and Vehicles
TLC Special Patrolman are prohibited by New York State Law (Criminal Procedure Law) to use or carry a firearm, but do carry use a variety of equipment, they do carry:

Handcuffs
Radio linked with central dispatch  and other officers

TLC Uniform Service Bureau use typical marked patrol vehicles, equipped with red and white flashing lights, sirens, radios and marked as "TLC POLICE" or "ENFORCEMENT".

Training
TLC Special Patrolman go through a 21 week training which includes:

tactical,
fitness,
customer service training,

Ranks
The TLC Special Patrolmen rank structure is as follows:

Future Goals
The city's goal is to have the Medallion Taxicab fleet reach 50% wheelchair-accessibility by 2020. The number of wheelchair-accessible taxis in New York City has tripled from 238 in 2013 to 850 taxicabs on the road in 2016. Almost 300 new wheelchair-accessible medallion taxicabs went into service in the first six months of 2016, according to TLC data.

Since September 2015, taxicab medallion owners may purchase the Taxi of Tomorrow (a Nissan NV200 Taxi), a TLC-approved wheelchair-accessible vehicle, or a hybrid vehicle. The first Taxi of Tomorrow began providing service in October 2013. Its features include a large cabin, passenger charging stations and reading lights, independent passenger climate control, yellow seatbelt straps, handles to assist stepping in and out, a clear panoramic roof, and sliding doors to prevent injuries from dooring. The NV200 taxicab is the first taxi vehicle to be equipped with Hearing Loop technology.

Licensing and Standards 
The TLC licenses and sets standards for the New York City’s diverse taxi and for-hire vehicle industries. This includes licensing drivers and vehicles in those industries. Drivers seeking to obtain a license from the TLC are fingerprinted, must pass a drug test, complete a driver education course approved by the TLC that includes a defensive driving course, and must undergo wheelchair-accessible vehicle training; among other requirements. The TLC also closely reviews an applicant’s driving history.

Vehicle owners seeking to obtain a license to use their vehicle in the for-hire vehicle industries are subject to inspections by the TLC and receive a TLC license plate from the New York State Department of Motor Vehicles. Bases that dispatch vehicles, which include app-based companies, are licensed by the TLC.

Controversies and criticisms
TLC inspectors may seize vehicles suspected of operating as an illegal cab, and DNAinfo reported in 2014 that the city Office of Administrative Trials and Hearings' Taxi and Limousine Tribunal dismissed 1442 of the 7187 accusations over 1.5 years. The TLC said in a statement that "while the vast majority of cases—more than 80%—are prosecuted as written, the fact that there are a certain number of cases that are dismissed means that the system works for everyone." Owners can't retrieve their impounded cars unless they plead guilty and pay a fine, or until their hearing before a city administrative judge.

In 2005, the TLC refused to allow alternative-fuel vehicles to be used as cabs, despite the New York City Council's vote to approve them. Cab operator Gene Freidman, who had purchased several hybrid vehicles after the council's ruling, sued the TLC in New York's Supreme Court. The City Council, "angered" by the TLC's defiance of its decision, passed a bill  in June 2005 compelling the TLC to approve at least one alternative-fuel vehicle to be used as a taxicab. The TLC relented and approved six hybrid models to be used as cabs.

In April 2015, the TLC posted a notice in the City Record proposing the "Licensing of For-Hire Vehicle Dispatch Applications", requiring mobile app operators to apply for approval of certain changes to any app used to arrange vehicle rides for hire, widely considered to be targeted at Uber, causing a controversy.

In August 2018, the TLC stopped issuing new vehicle licenses for one year, in an attempt to "study the effects of ride-hail services in the city."

A Motherboard report, using information obtained through a Freedom of Information Act request, confirmed rumors that at least five TLC-licensed cabs were in reality undercover New York City Police Department vehicles. TLC refused to comment, as did NYPD. Both agencies were subsequently criticized for lack of transparency and accused of using the undercover cabs in stop-and-frisk and racial profiling operations by a National Lawyers Guild Police Accountability Project member.

See also
 Taxis of New York City
 New York City Office of Administrative Trials and Hearings (OATH), for hearings conducted on summonses for TLC rules and regulations violations

References
Notes

Further reading

External links
 New York City Taxi and Limousine Commission
 Taxi and Limousine Commission in the Rules of the City of New York
 CityAdmin, a collection of NYC administrative decisions from the Center for New York City Law

Taxi and Limousine Commission
1971 establishments in New York City
Law enforcement agencies of New York City